U.S. Route 27 (US 27) in Florida is a north–south United States Highway. It runs  from the South Florida Metropolitan Area northwest to the Tallahassee Metropolitan Statistical Area. Throughout the state, US 27 has been designated the Claude Pepper Memorial Highway by the Florida Legislature. It was named after long-time Florida statesman Claude Pepper, who served in both the U.S. Senate and House of Representatives. The stretch running from Miami to South Bay was originally designated the Thomas E. Will Memorial Highway by the Florida Legislature in 1937 when that portion was known as Florida State Road 26. Will, the founder of Okeelanta, Florida, had worked for almost twenty years to get the state to build a road from Miami to the area south of Lake Okeechobee. For most of its length in the state, US 27 is a divided highway.

Between Miami and Ocala, US 27 follows SR 25, between Leesburg and Williston, it follows SR 500, between Williston and High Springs, it follows SR 45, between High Springs and Downtown Tallahassee, it follows SR 20, within Downtown Tallahassee it follows SR 61, and between Tallahassee and the Georgia border, it follows State Road 63 (SR 63).

Concurrencies include State Road 80, between South Bay and Clewiston, SR 78 from Moore Haven to Citrus Center, US 98 between Sebring and West Frostproof, US 441 between Leesburg and Ocala, which also includes a concurrency with US 301 between Belleview and Ocala. Others include US 41 between Williston and High Springs, SR 20 between High Springs and Tallahassee, US 129 in Branford, US 19 between Perry and Capps, and SR 61 in Tallahassee.

Route description

Miami through Central Florida

US 27 begins its northward journey as North 36th Street in Midtown Miami, heading west from US 1 for  before turning northwest to pass under the western terminus of the Airport Expressway (State Road 112, SR 112). It then proceeds northwest for five miles (8 km) as South Okeechobee Road, parallel to the Miami Canal, forming the southwest boundary of the city of Hialeah. After an interchange with the Palmetto Expressway (SR 826), it continues northwest as North Okeechobee Road for five miles (8 km) before an interchange with the Homestead Extension of the Florida Turnpike. After another four miles (6 km), the highway curves to the north and, after passing the northern terminus of Krome Avenue (SR 997), crosses into Broward County.

In Broward County, the highway passes protected wetlands and heavy duty power lines on the west and the outer reaches of the suburban communities of Pembroke Pines and Weston on the east where it curves to the northwest. It passes by West Broward High School in Pembroke Pines, in which many school buses coming from Sheridan Street use US 27 to get to Johnson Street to where the high school is. US 27 then reaches an interchange with I-75 and Alligator Alley (exit 23) which is an elaborate partial cloverleaf with flyovers from US 27, loop ramps from I-75 and no re-entry to either road. From here, the road is surrounded by Everglades-related wilderness and recreational areas before curving to the north toward South Bay, where it intersects SR 80 and overlaps the road before curving west along the shores of Lake Okeechobee. The highway skirts the southwestern shore of Lake Okeechobee and then heads west through Lake Harbor and then Clewiston, before making a sharp turn to the north towards Moore Haven, where it crosses the Mamie Langdale Memorial Bridge over the Caloosahatchee Canal and makes another sharp turn to the west. The road then intersects with SR 78, which it overlaps until reaching Citrus Center, then proceeds in a northerly direction toward the central Florida communities such as Lake Placid, where it intersects SR 70.

The southern terminus of the concurrency with U.S. Route 98 is also the eastern terminus of SR 66. From here, the hidden routes are SR 25 and SR 700. Shortly after this, US 27/US 98 runs through a commercial strip area before curving to the west at a wye intersection along the south shore of Lake Jackson in Sebring, where SR 17 begins. The road heads back to the northwest as it runs along and then away from the edge of the lake. North of here, the road runs west of Lake Sebring, but in Avon Park it runs much closer to the shores of Lake Glenada, where it passes through South Florida Community College territory. From here it passes by Lake Lelia, and Lake Anoka, and just east of Avon Park Executive Airport it intersects SR 64 and the northern terminus of a segment of SR 17. SR 64 continues east along part of SR 17 as a bi-county extension northeast into Polk County which runs through Lake Wales Ridge State Forest and terminates at the Avon Park Air Force Range. North of here, US 27 carries hidden state routes (SRs 17, 25 and 700) into Polk County until it reaches Sunray Deli Estates, where SR 17 breaks away again, and runs relatively parallel to US 27 until it reaches Haines City. Meanwhile, after making a reverse curve over a bridge above a CSX Railroad Line that is used by Amtrak's Silver Star and Silver Meteor lines, US 98 breaks away in West Frostproof, taking SR 700 with it. In the opposite direction of this intersection is a continuation of County Road 630. After passing by Warner University, Crooked Lake Park and County Road 640, US 27 becomes slightly less rural as it approaches an un-numbered partial cloverleaf interchange with SR 60 in Lake Wales. North of this point, US 27 becomes a six-lane highway, and remains that way until reaching SR 540 in Waverly, Florida, where the road narrows down to four lanes again. However, the widening of US 27 to a six-lane highway continues in Polk County between here and SR 542 in Dundee. North of here, US 27 runs through Lake Hamilton, and curves around the eastern shores of the lake for which the community was named. After passing by a pair of gated communities and crossing over a bridge between Middle Lake Hamilton, and the ironically named larger Little Lake Hamilton, it curves north and intersects SR 544. Taking a turn to the northeast after passing by Lake Henry, US 27 encounters another un-numbered interchange with U.S. Route 17/92 in Haines City, and immediately passes over another CSX Railroad Line that is used by Amtrak's Silver Star and Silver Meteor lines. With the exception of a segment between Hammock Lake and Tower Lake, most of US 27 remains a commercial strip, especially as it enters Davenport, and approaches quarter-cloverleaf interchanges on the southeast and northwest corners of the bridge over Interstate 4 at exit 55.

Citrus Ridge to Santos

North of I-4, US 27 contains more un-numbered interchanges. The first of which is a trumpet interchange with US 192 (SR 530) on the Polk-Lake County Line in Citrus Ridge, and shortly afterwards an at-grade intersection with CR 474 (CR 474), although some maps have indicated another interchange here. Most of the road remains a rural four-lane highway with at-grade intersections. After passing by Lake Louisa State Park and winding around the eastern shores of the lake that the park was named for, US 27 approaches a cloverleaf interchange without exit numbers at SR 50 in Clermont. After passing the Florida Citrus Tower and Presidents Hall of Fame, the road enters Minneola along the east side of Lake Minneola, where it crosses a bridge over the South Lake-Lake Minneola Scenic Trail, intersects such roads as CR Old 50, as well as CR 561, the latter of which it shares a brief concurrency. After this it briefly runs parallel to the southwest side of Florida's Turnpike, until it veers slightly to the west and approaches a quarter-cloverleaf interchange with SR 19 south of Howey-in-the-Hills, which also includes a southbound interchange with Florida's Turnpike. The northbound Turnpike interchange can be found further northwest. At Okahumpka, US 27 intersects two county roads that are extensions of state roads. The first of which is CR 48, and the next of which is the northern terminus of CR 33 before running along the western shore of Lake Harris and eastern shore of Lake Denham, the location of Singletary Park. Here it intersects CR 25A. North of Lake Harris, it enters Leesburg where US 27 has an intersection with SR 44. US 441 later joins US 27, and as a result, the hidden state routes are officially SR 25/SR 500. SR 500 becomes more prominent however, because in Lady Lake, SR 25 branches away as County Road 25. This once served as the southern terminus of the US 27/US 441 Alternate Route around Lake Weir into Belleview, but still remains a scenic route.

Around the Lake-Marion county border, US 27-441 enters a retirement community known as The Villages. Because of the frequent use of street-legal golf cars in the community, bridges and tunnels for these carts can be found throughout the road. US 27/US 441 leaves The Villages as it approaches CR 42, a bi-county east-west scenic route through Central Florida. North of here, it serves as the newly constructed bypass that leads to CR 484, in Summerfield. Within Belleview, the road encounters two somewhat important intersections; CR 25A, and then SR 35. SR 35 joins US 27/US 441 in a wrong-way concurrency with SR 500 as the road curves more to the west, until it reaches the intersection with US 301, where SR 35 turns south, and SR 500 becomes the hidden state road for US 27/US 301/US 441 for a few blocks. However SR 25 reunites with the triplex at the former eastern terminus of CR 484, and shares a concurrency with SR 25, and US 27/US 301/US 441's new secret route becomes SR 25/SR 500. After that the road curves more to the north again. Near the right of way for the formerly proposed Cross Florida Barge Canal, the median for the road widens, but narrows back down to normal again. Before it does, however, it intersects CR 328, where a police station exists between the median. Supports for a bridge that was intended to run over the canal exist behind the police station. To the west of this intersection is the Santos Trailhead of the Cross Florida Greenway.

Santos through High Springs

Before US 27/US 301/US 441 enters Ocala, it veers off to the left at an intersection with County Road Old 441 (Southeast Lake Weir Avenue), a former segment of US 441 that eventually leads to Ocala Union Station. The first major intersection after this is 31st Street. Then it crosses under a railroad bridge before reaching the City Limits and the intersections with the northern terminus of CR 475 and crossing SR 464 (17th Street). US 27/US 301/US 441 intersects with SR 200 (becoming the new hidden state road until US 301 reaches US 1/US 23). The highway reaches the heart of Ocala at the intersection with SR 40 (West Silver Springs Boulevard). After this, the road crosses a railroad bridge west of Ocala Union Station. Five blocks later, it reaches the intersection of SR 492(Northwest 10th Street) only to move in the opposite direction, leaving the US 301-441 overlap and taking SR 500 with it. After retaining its status as an independent US highway, US 27 moves from Northwest Tenth Street to Northwest Blitchton Road and has another interchange with I-75 at exit 354, although this one is a mere diamond interchange, as opposed to the elaborate partial cloverleaf with flyovers in Weston. From here it continues northwest through rural Marion County, much of which is surrounded by horse farms. The few truly significant intersection in this region include CR 464B in Fellowship and then CR 326 near Emathla.

The last intersections at the Marion-Levy county line are with CR 316 and CR 335. Though horse farms are scarce along this segment in Levy County, the surroundings remain rural. CR 316 begins again at an intersection with US 27 in East Williston, and as the road enters the City of Williston, it serves as the western terminus of CR 318, crosses a set of CSX railroad tracks, and loses its status as an independent US route. SR 500 continues straight ahead along US 27 Alt., while US 27 turns north and joins US 41 (hidden SR 45), as well as SR 121, which already ran east for a few blocks along US 27 Alt. The concurrency with SR 121 is short-lived though, as it branches away to the northeast. The US 27/US 41 concurrency is one of the few segments that are only two lanes wide, and it begins to lean to the northwest until briefly shifting straight north before approaching Archer, where it intersects CR 346, then a former Florida Railway and Navigation Company right-of-way, and finally SR 24. After SR 24, US 27/US 41 curves back northwest but head straight northward through SR 26 in Newberry and both remain as such until US 41 reaches High Springs, and joins US 441 towards Lake City and points north.

High Springs to Tallahassee

US 27 heads west along the unsigned SR 20. which is named First Avenue until it crosses the Santa Fe River and enters Columbia County. From here it continues to run northwest, but briefly turns straight west after entering Fort White just before intersecting SR 47. The road shifts to the right again and turns northwest before leaving the city, but gradually turns back west as it gets closer to Suwannee County. Before the road crosses the Ichetucknee River at the Columbia-Suwannee county line, it intersects with Southwest Riverside Avenue, which serves as the western terminus of the O'Leno to Ichetucknee Trail and the eastern terminus of the Suwannee River Greenway, a former ACL Railroad line. Both US 27 and the trail run through Hildreth, the home of the Ichetucknee Springs State Park, and then encounters the east end of a concurrency with US 129 (SR 49) which is also the southern terminus of CR 49. US 27/US 129 and the trail enter the hamlet of Wachtokha, but the trail remains straight while the road curves slightly to the northwest. A slight curve to the southwest is where both routes officially enter Branford where US 129 turns north onto unsigned SR 249. The Suwannee River Greenway crosses US 27 between the west end of the US 27/US 129 concurrency and Frank R. Norris Bridge across the Suwannee River, but it was also once the northern terminus of US 129 Alt., which followed US 27 across the river into Lafayette County until it reached SR 349 in Grady.

The road runs through the rural community of Alton, then slows down as it enters Mayo where it intersects SR 51, the northwest corner of which contains the historic Lafayette County Courthouse. After the intersection of Lafayette Street, the road curves northwest again. Outside the city limits, the road intersects various local roads, the most significant of which is CR 534. The rest of the way, US 27 runs northwest through more of western rural Lafayette County, but it turns straight west again as it approaches Buckville where it intersects the southern terminus of CR 53 and northern terminus of CR 534, both of which were once part of SR 53. The last intersection in Lafayette County is with CR 348 in Townsend before US 27 becomes surrounded by swampland as it enters Taylor County.

Swampland continues to surround US 27 until it comes close to Perry, where a small truck weigh station can be found along the westbound shoulder. The road divides momentarily at the intersection of SR 30, which has controlled turn lanes in the divider, but then turns back into an undivided two lane road as it curves northwest. At Buckeye Nursery Road, US 27 gets the name East Hampton Springs Avenue. East Hampton Springs curves from northwest to southwest once again, and the straight west at Washington Street. The street name changes from East Hampton Springs Avenue to West Hampton Springs Avenue at US 221 (hidden SR 55) and also joins US 221 Truck. Several blocks later the road intersects Byron Butler Parkway which is the northern terminus of the US 19/US 98/US 27 Alt. concurrency. Here, US 27 Alt. terminates, US 98 and SR 30 leave US 19 turning west onto West Hampton Springs Avenue, and US 27 joins US 19 becoming a four-lane highway again. US 19/US 27 also continues to carry US 221 Truck until it reaches CR 359A (Wright Road), but also continues to take SR 20 with it heading straight northwest through the rest of Taylor County, and then very briefly in Madison County, where it intersects CR 150. US 19 breaks away in Capps onto SR 57 on its way through Monticello, but not before resuming a westward direction at the Madison-Jefferson county line. In Tallahassee, the road becomes the 1957-built Apalachee Parkway, a major east–west thoroughfare. The parkway has a short expressway section just east of the capitol, then is a busy four-lane surface boulevard with service roads for the next few miles, passing the Governor's Square Mall, Tallahassee Mall and many state office buildings. US 27 runs west along this stretch of road however, and the Apalachee Parkway ends at SR 61 (Monroe Street) in front of the Florida State Capitol building. US 27 and SR 20 make a sharp turn north along SR 61, but at the intersection of US 90, SR 20 turns west while US 27 continues north along SR 61.

North from Tallahassee

After the intersection with US 90, hidden SR 63 officially begins at the intersection of North Monroe Street and Thomasville Road, where SR 61 resumes its status as a separate exposed route. After crossing Seventh Avenue, it begins to curve to the northwest avoiding Lake Ella. The first intersection during this curve is County Road 158 (Tharpe Street), and is the beginning of SR 63's alternate street name of Old Quincy Highway.

SR 63 approaches its only suffixed auxiliary route in the form of CR 63A before encountering a partial cloverleaf interchange with I-10 (exit 199). North of the interchange, it begins to leave the Tallahassee City Limits. A great deal of this segment of SR 63 consists of RV parks and other facilities serving tourists for the Lake Jackson Mounds Archaeological State Park It also serves as the northeast terminus of CR 0356. After crossing a bridge that runs over a small portion of Lake Jackson, the road simultaneously intersects the northern terminus of SR 263 and southern terminus of CR 157 and CR 0361.

The road runs along the west side of Tallahassee Commercial Airport, and makes a reverse curve as it approaches a bridge over the Ochlockonee River, where it crosses the Leon-Gadsden county line and continues to move northwest. After crossing another bridge, the first major intersection in the county is the eastern terminus of CR 270. Further north, CR 159 secretly joins US 27/SR 63 in a triple concurrency, and all three routes approach a CSX Railroad line until they curve northeast before entering the Town of Havana. CR 159 branches off on its own to the northwest before US 27/SR 63 curves straight north as it approaches the intersection with SR 12 and CR 12A. SR 12 joins the road in a brief concurrency before branching off to the east as CR 12, within the Havana Town Limits. The previously mentioned CSX railroad line runs more or less parallel to the road again. The road and the tracks curve back and forth near each other until the tracks take one final turn to the northwest in Hinson, and SR 63 begins to curve back to the northeast before the intersection with CR 159A. Shortly after this SR 63 curves further to the northeast as it approaches CR 12B. Finally in Darsey, SR 63 serves as the northern terminus of CR 157 and the southern terminus of an extension of Georgia State Route 111, before curving to the northwest again and finally terminating at the Florida-Georgia State Line, where US 27 continues onto Georgia State Route 1.

History

US 27 first entered Florida in 1934, terminating at Tallahassee. In 1949, it was extended to its current terminus in Miami.

From 1956 until 1993, US 27 signs in Florida featured white numbering on a green shield. The "color-coding" of U.S. Routes by the Florida Department of Transportation was stopped when the state could no longer use Federal funds to replace the signs with anything but the standard black-and-white version; a few green US 27 signs remain.

Shortly after its second landfall, Hurricane Irma's eye traveled roughly along the entire course of US 27 in Florida north of Lake Placid.

In January 2021, State Representative Anthony Sabatini announced he will sponsor an amendment to name the section of US 27 in Florida as the President Donald J. Trump Highway after former President Donald Trump.

Major intersections

Related routes

At least four special routes of US 27 have existed in Florida, however only one exists today.

 U.S. Route 27 Alternate – Sebring Southgate to Avon Park; former route
 U.S. Route 27 Alternate – Sunray Deli Estates (north of Avon Park) to Haines City; former route
 U.S. Route 27 Alternate – Lady Lake to Belleview; former route co-signed with Alternate U.S. Route 441.
 U.S. Route 27 Alternate – Williston to Perry

See also

References

External links

US 27 in Florida (SoutheastRoads.com)

 Florida
27
27
27
27
27
27
27
27
27
27
27
27
27
27
27
27
27
27
27
27
27
1934 establishments in Florida